Malindi Constituency is an electoral constituency in Kilifi County, Kenya. It was one of seven constituencies in the county and one of two constituencies in the now defunct Malindi District.

Members of Parliament

Locations and wards

References

External links 
Map of the constituency

Malindi
Constituencies in Kilifi County
Constituencies in Coast Province